Şener Şen (born 26 December 1941) is a Turkish film and theatre actor who has won the Golden Orange for Best Actor twice for his roles in Mr. Muhsin (1985) and Lovelorn (2005), the Golden Orange for Best Supporting Actor for Çöpçüler Kralı (1977) and a Golden Orange Lifetime Achievement Award.

Biography 
Şener Şen is the son of actor Ali Şen and the brother of actress İnci Şen. Şener Şen began acting in 1958 at the age of 17 as an amateur at the Yeşil Sahne Theater in Cağaloğlu. From 1964 to 1966 he taught in elementary schools in the villages of eastern Anatolia. In 1966 he returned to the stage at the City Theater in Istanbul. He made his film debut with a small role in the drama film So-Called Girls (1967), directed by Nejat Saydam.

For his role as Nazım in Yavuz Turgul's movie Gönül Yarası (2005), he won the "Best Actor" award at the 42nd International Antalya Golden Orange Film Festival. His roles in the movies Kabadayı (2007) and Av Mevsimi (2010) in which he shared the leading role with Çetin Tekindor and Cem Yılmaz are among his latest works. In 2015, Şen appeared in a commercial for Aygaz.

On 28 December 2016, at the Presidential Culture and Arts Grand Prize ceremony, he received an award from President Recep Tayyip Erdoğan after which he said: "Stories tell us how we can live life. I have carefully selected the characters I've portrayed to serve the good and right. I believed that societies looking for good, right and beauty will always live in peace. I accept this award with the hope of contributing to our social peace."

Şen is the father of one daughter, Bengü Şen (b. 1974) from his first marriage.

Filmography

TV shows 

 İkinci Bahar

Awards 

 1978 15. Antalya Film Festivali (15th Antalya Film Festival), Çöpçüler Kralı, Best Supporting Actor
 1987 24. Antalya Film Festivali (15th Antalya Film Festival), Muhsin Bey, Best Actor
 1997 Valencia Film Festival, Eşkiya, Best Actor
 2005 42. Antalya Film Festivali (15th Antalya Film Festival), Gönül Yarası, Best Actor
 2016 Cumhurbaşkanlığı Kültür ve Sanat Büyük Ödülleri (Presidential Culture and Arts Grand Awards)

References

External links 
 Fan Page www.senersen.net

 Şener Şen, Turkish Movies for English-speakers

1941 births
Turkish male stage actors
Turkish male film actors
People from Adana
Best Supporting Actor Golden Orange Award winners
Golden Orange Life Achievement Award winners
Best Actor Golden Orange Award winners
State Artists of Turkey
Living people